Harry Hulmes III (July 20, 1927 – February 21, 2016) was a businessman who was an NFL and MLB executive. He was a sports executive from 1954 to 2008. He was the general manager for the Baltimore Colts from 1967 to 1969.

Early life
Harry Hulmes was born on July 20, 1927, in Philadelphia, Pennsylvania. He went to high school at Northeast High School. After high school, he served in the United States Navy in World War II. He went to college at the University of Pennsylvania.

Executive career

Baltimore Orioles
He began his career as the Assistant Business Manager for the Baltimore Orioles. He was only there for one year, in 1954.

Bucknell University
After a year with the Orioles, he went to Bucknell University to become a Sports Information Director. He was there for three years; from 1955 to 1957.

Baltimore Colts
In 1958, he began his NFL career. He became a Business Manager for the Baltimore Colts. He was also a public relations director with the Colts. In 1967, he became the General Manager for them. They had a 11-1-2 record in his first season. The next year they had a 13–1 record and made the playoffs. He made it to the Super Bowl, but lost 16–7 to the New York Jets. In his final year as a General Manager, he had a 8-5-1 record.

New Orleans Saints
After 1969, he went to the New Orleans Saints. He was with the Saints for 13 seasons. He had numerous roles in his 13 seasons, they included: Assistant General Manager, Director of PR, Director of Player Personnel, and VP of Administration.

Arizona Wranglers
In 1983, he went to the Arizona Wranglers of the USFL. He was their Chief Operating Officer in his one season with them.

New York Giants
In 1984, he went to the New York Giants. He became their Assistant General Manager. He was the Assistant from 1984 to 1998. He retired in 1998 but continued to work with them until 2008 as a scout. He finished his career after 2008. In his career he won 5 combined Championships and Super Bowls.

Death
Hulmes died on February 21, 2016, at the age of 88.

References

External links
 Harry Hulmes Obituary
 Harry Hulmes, former Giants assistant GM, dies at 88
 Former Giants assistant general manager Harry Hulmes dies at 88
 The New York Giants remember Harry Hulmes III
 Former Saints executive Harry Hulmes III dies at 88
 Harry Hulmes passes away
  Harry Hulmes III, NFL lifer and ex-Giants exec, dead at 88 
 Former Giants assistant GM Harry Hulmes dies
 Remembering Harry Hulmes III, 1927–2016

1927 births
2016 deaths
People from Philadelphia
Baltimore Orioles executives
Indianapolis Colts executives
New Orleans Saints executives
New York Giants executives
United States Navy personnel of World War II